Michele O'Neil is an Australian trade unionist and president of the Australian Council of Trade Unions (ACTU) since 2018.

Union career
O'Neil was previously the Branch and National Secretary of the Textile Clothing and Footwear Union of Australia (TCFUA).

Union movement
In 2004, she told union members to consider cutting ties with the Australian Labor Party (ALP) over tariff cuts in the clothing, footwear and textiles industries.

O'Neil spoke in favour of scrapping boat turn-backs in 2015 when a delegate at the Labor party conference.

In 2018, O'Neil was elected president of the ACTU.

Personal life
Born in Melbourne, O’Neil is the youngest of five daughters. Her mother left school at 13 to work in a tannery in Melbourne and worked as a waitress, and in various other casual jobs while raising five daughters. O'Neil's father served in the army, before serving as a public servant and briefly as an Australian Football League (AFL) administrator.

References
 Australian council of Trade Unions Elected Officers

Living people
Trade unionists from Melbourne
Year of birth missing (living people)